Rosemary Ampem  (born 27 August 1992) is a Ghanaian footballer who plays as a defender for the Ghana women's national football team. She was part of the team at the 2014 African Women's Championship. On club level she played for Immigration Accra in Ghana.

References

1992 births
Living people
Ghanaian women's footballers
Ghana women's international footballers
Place of birth missing (living people)
Women's association football defenders